Andy Dosty, born Andrew Amoh, is a Ghanaian disc jockey and radio presenter with Multimedia Group Limited. In 2017, he took over as the host of Daybeak Hitz on Hitz FM. He is a recipient of the 2019 National Communications Awards Radio Personality of the Year.

Career 
In addition to being a presenter and DJ, Dosty has hosted a variety of programs in Ghana and beyond, including the launch of The Taste of Afrika program.

In 2018, Dosty was incorporated as a board member of the Ghana DJ awards. Additionally, Dosty was selected by the International Youth Empowerment Foundation, in 2019, as an ambassador for its annual youth summit.

In 2019, Dosty released a single, featuring Kuami Eugene, titled "Love You Die". Later that year, he sparked controversy when he sought public opinion on a statement made by Ghanaian dance hall musician, Shatta Wale, on social media. Dosty later took credit helping to make Wale a successful artist in Ghana. Fans of Wale claimed Dosty had twisted the facts.

In 2021, Dosty sacked the up-and-coming performer Okese 1 for reporting late at his studio and behaving rudely.

References 

Ghanaian DJs
Year of birth missing (living people)
Living people